James Makittrick Adair M.D. (1728–1802), a native of Inverness, and youngest son of James Makittrick, held several occupations but is best remembered for his medical ethics and treatment of slaves and the poor.  He was educated at the grammar school and University of Edinburgh.  Early in life he was an officer in the army.  Having wasted his own fortune and that of his wife, a descendant of the Adair family, he became an officer in the revenue department at Edinburgh and was later appointed surgeon's mate of the  sloop-of-war Porcupine, bound to the Leeward Islands.

Shortly thereafter, he returned to England and soon decided to proceed to Antigua, where he became assistant to a relative, and began to study the medical profession. He also undertook the management of an estate on Antigua, becoming familiar with the condition of the slaves.  Although he was anxious for the improvement of the conditions of the slaves, he was opposed to emancipation. He published a tract in 1789 on the subject of the abolition of slavery, in which he tried to depict the real state of slavery in the West Indies, the probable consequences of the abolition of the slave trade; to point out some grievances of the slave, the means by which they might be relieved, and, he added, the necessary regulations of the hospital for the management of the sick. He held that humanity to slaves and religious instruction were the only securities upon which the West India planter could safely rely. His own conduct towards slaves was very kind. He protected and nurtured them as his own children, and they were friendly in return.

In a few years he left the West Indies, took a voyage to America, and made the acquaintance of Benjamin Franklin. After a tour in the United States, he returned to Edinburgh, took his degree of M.D., and then settled as a physician at Andover, in Hampshire.

After the war with America had commenced, he returned to the West Indies on short notice, at the request of a friend.  Upon his arrival he was appointed physician to Monk's Hill and to the commander-in-chief of the troops, and also as one of the assistant judges of the Courts of King's Bench and Common Pleas. At this time he adopted the name of Adair, having become the next male heir to the estate of his mother's family.

In 1783 he left the West Indies, returned to England, and settled at Bath, where he became in volved in many disputes with his professional colleagues and others. These arose partly from his determined opposition to quacks and quackery—his attempts to expose and suppress quackery may be seen as quixotic, but they were no less laudable. His temper was, however, altogether unfit for the warfare which he brought about.  He was naturally querulous, hot, and irascible, and his disposition had been soured by disappointments in domestic life. He was, however, a man of an affectionate nature, and endowed with lively sensibility. He was generous to the poor, and the profits of the work he published were all given to support the Bath hospital. His professional acquirements were of no mean description, and he appears to have been a close and rational observer.

He became hypochondriacal, and died at Harrogate in 1802.

Works
He published the following works.

Medical Cautions for the consideration of Invalids, Bath, 1786, 8vo. second edition, 1787. These specially relate to diet and regimen, and there is a table of the relative digestibility of foods; also essays on fashionable diseases; the dangerous effects of hot and crowded rooms; an inquiry into the use of medicine during a course of mineral waters; and on quacks, quack medicines, and lady doctors.
A Philosophical and Medical Sketch of the Natural History of the Human Body and Mind, Bath, 1787, 8vo. To this work is subjointed an Essay on the Difficulties of attaining Medical Knowledge.
Unanswerable Arguments against the Abolition of the Slave Trade, Bath, 1789, 8vo.
Essays on Fashionable Diseases, Bath, 1790, 8vo.
Essay on a Nondescript, or Newly-invented Disease, 1790, 8vo. He published some papers in the Medical Commentaries, especially one in vol. viii on smallpox in the West Indies, and in vol. xvii on the successful use of cuprum vitriolatum and conium, in two cases of tuberculosis; some strange memoirs relative to himself, etc., under the title of P. Paragraph and R. Goosequill; and also some remarks on Philip Thicknesse, under the same title; and two sermons addressed to sailors and slaves in the West Indies.

References

External links

1728 births
1802 deaths
18th-century Scottish medical doctors
Scottish surgeons
Scottish writers
People from Inverness
Hypochondriacs
British colonial judges in the Americas
Alumni of the University of Edinburgh
18th-century British judges
Scottish slave owners